Katarina Smith ( Allberg, born 17 January 1971) is a former Swedish, later Canadian orienteering competitor. She received a silver medal for Sweden on the relay at the 2001 World Orienteering Championships in Tampere, and a bronze medal in 1999.

She finished 8th overall in the 1998 Orienteering World Cup, and 4th in 2000. She finished 5th overall in the World Cup 2002, this time for Canada.

She received a bronze medal in the classic course at the Junior World Orienteering Championships in 1991.

She has been ranked among the top female orienteers on the North American continent by the North American Orienteering League.

References

External links
 

1971 births
Living people
Swedish orienteers
Female orienteers
Swedish emigrants to Canada
Canadian orienteers
Foot orienteers
World Orienteering Championships medalists
Junior World Orienteering Championships medalists
Competitors at the 2001 World Games